Buko is a village and a former municipality in the district of Wittenberg, Saxony-Anhalt, Germany. Since 1 January 2009, it is part of the town of Coswig (Anhalt).

References

Former municipalities in Saxony-Anhalt
Coswig, Saxony-Anhalt
Duchy of Anhalt